Gade Venkat Reddy is a senior most politician from Prakasam district and 5 terms MLA of the Indian National Congress Party. He was first elected in 1967 from Parchur Constituency, then within Bapatla Taluk and Guntur district. He is an advocate and businessman by profession and entered into politics later.

He has been elected to serve as the Member of the Legislative Assembly for Bapatla Assembly constituency in Andhra Pradesh, India, between 2004 and 2014. He represents the Indian National Congress.

Early life
Gade Venkata Reddy was born at Pavuluru in Prakasam district to Gade Veera Reddy. He has graduated B.A (LLB) in 1959 in Bapatla.

Political career
He was elected as Member of Legislative Assembly to Bapatla (Assembly constituency) seat during 2009 assembly elections.

Ministerial portfolios held
Cabinet Minister for Endowments under Y. S. Rajasekhara Reddy & Konijeti Rosaiah between 2009 and 2010.
Cabinet Minister for Excise & Prohibition under Kotla Vijaya Bhaskara Reddy in 1993.

References 

1945 births
Living people
Indian National Congress politicians from Andhra Pradesh
Members of the Andhra Pradesh Legislative Assembly
People from Guntur district